The Federation of Islamic Medical Associations (FIMA) was formed on December 31, 1981. FIMA was incorporated in the State of Indiana as a not-for-profit corporation on January 18, 1982.

Since 1981, 29 FIMA Council meetings have been held. The 30th was hosted by South Africa, in Cape Town from 19–20 September 2013.
Currently, there are 29 full members and 12 associate members, representing about 50,000 Muslim medical and health professionals.

Aims
 To foster the unity and welfare of Muslim medical and healthcare professionals all over the world.
 To promote Islamic medical activities including health services, education and research, through cooperation and coordination among member organizations.
 To promote the understanding and the application of Islamic principles in the field of medicine.
 To mobilize professional and economic resources in order to provide medical care and relief to affected areas and communities.
 To promote the exchange of medical information and technical expertise among member organizations.

Projects 
The projects have incorporated:

 Medical teaching (Consortium of Islamic Medical Colleges-CIMCO)
 Hospital services (Islamic Hospital Consortium-IHC)
 Continuing Professional Education (Accreditation Council for Certification of Continuing Medical Education-ACCCME)
 Student activities (Umrah & Ziarah, Winter and Summer Camps)
 Information & communication technology (FIMA Hi-Tech Center)
 Publications (FIMA Year Book & FIMA Newsletter)
 Humanitarian relief (multiple relief missions worldwide and partnership in Islamic Council for Da’wa & Relief)
 Research studies (FIMA Health Policy Initiative)
 International networking (close liaison with UN, WHO, OIC; Islamic Organisation of Medical Sciences IOMS)

Newsletters 

 2013
 2016

See also
British Islamic Medical Association

References

External links
 

Medical associations based in the United States
Islamic charities based in the United States
Medical and health organizations based in Illinois